The Centre for Social Research (CSR), established in 1983, is an advocacy group for women based in New Delhi, India. The group tries to bring attention and justice to all marginalized and underprivileged areas of society. They offer services to women and girls throughout the country, and focus on restructuring gender relations with the aim of creating a more humane, equitable and gender-just society.

Empowerment of Women 
In 1997, CSR founded the Gender Training Institute (GTI) to facilitate the empowerment of women and social justice through capacity building and training-related activities. GTI's trainings investigate gendered interactions happening in other areas of life like media, economy, politics and culture. Leadership skills and the ability to address gender issues in their lives and that of society will be passed on to participants. With the support of the United Nations Democracy Fund (UNDEF), GTI also founded a program "Enhancing the Role of Women in Strengthening Democracy", where 1000 women leaders were geared up to run for and serve in state and national political offices. Crisis Intervention Centres (CICs) are also managed under the understanding that fighting gender-based violence involves direct assistance as well as sensitization and mobilization of grassroots communities.

GTI has also implemented a project on "Promotion of Women's Rights through Networking, Lobbying, Advocacy and Capacity Building". The 3rd phase of the project was successfully completed with as much success on initiating the 4th phase of the project which incorporated Men and boys in the process. Another initiative of GTI was to commence the first one of its kind online course launched on "Training women in leadership and Democracy". CSR further launched a certificate program, India-Women in Leadership (iWIL), in collaboration with Centre for Public Policy that includes lectures, field visits and travels.

Eliminating Sex-Selection 
Eliminating Female infanticide in long term will resolve the biasness towards sex selection. CSR implemented the Meri Shakti, Meri Beti (My Daughter, My Strength) project in 2007 to reduce pre-natal sex selection. It has organized over 40 Community Outreach Programs, nine Community Watch Group meetings, two Expert Group meetings and one Interface Workshop in the Kurukshetra district of Haryana state. A second phase of the campaign was launched in 2013.

The second workshop for the Meri Shakti, Meri Beti project was initiated by Manasi Mishra who emphasized issues regarding the social and economic implications of pre-natal sex selection. Results indicated 100 students had signed the petition and pledged to support the prevention of female foeticide in their communities. In addition, a continuous effort is made by reaching out to the public, creating awareness through campaigns and workshops to increase the sex ratio. These will also serve as educating materials to the local communities in encouraging their taking a stand against sex selection.

Beti Bachao Beti Padhao 
As a mark of recognition to CSR's contribution in raising the sex ratio in the districts that it worked, when in January 2015, the Government of India launched ‘BetiBachao, BetiPadhao’ (BBBP), a watershed program to address the problem of sex-selection on a large scale, CSR was chosen by the Women and Child Development (WCD) (former) Minister Smt. Maneka Gandhi, as the nodal agency to implement BBBP in five skewed sex ratio districts of Haryana namely Ambala, Kurukshetra, Gurgaon, Jhajjar & Mahendragarh. CSR's recommendations were incorporated in the implementation of BBBP program.

Following the continuous implementation and rigorous intervention in the five gender critical districts, there were noteworthy change in the Child Sex Ratios in the districts.

Women's Education 
One of the projects under CSR is to provide free education to underprivileged children specifically targeted at girls. CSR operates several schools such as a primary school Parivartan Praveshika in Etawah that aims to provide primary school education for girls who have never attended school or had early drop-outs. Furthermore, CSR has an adult literacy program that functions as a non-formal education and also counseling regarding violence against women. With such project initiatives, CSR managed to provide education for over 2500 adolescent girls and more than 9000 women in the year 2003.

Women Skill Development 
Women in our society have different training needs than men since they are burdened with household chores and their off-springs responsibilities, moreover, at times contribute as a subsistence farmers or low-paid labourers. Despite India's growing GDP at around 7% Female Labour Force Participation is going down i.e. 34% to 27%. Moreover, the female-male wage gap has also been stagnant on 50% (HDR, 2018). Hence, the Skill Development becomes a key to improve their household capacity, autonomy and employability. Income earning opportunities also enhances their sustainable livelihood and development in a long run.

Skill India mission was launched in July 2015 by the Ministry of Skill Development and Entrepreneurship (MSDE) and since then it has transformed lives of over 35.36 lakh women through empowering them for better and secured livelihood through skill training. Through CSR's Women Skill Development program lakhs of women underwent skill-based training and have improved their lives.

Political Leadership 
Despite being beacons of change and having the apparent right to participate equally in democratic governance, women face several conspicuous and inconspicuous structural and institutional barriers to participate in political life, from the local to the global level. For women as a community, it's fundamental to be open opportunities on a level playing field.

The department of Political Leadership has been assigned the responsibility of designing strategies and undertaking advocacy and campaigns for the political empowerment of women, and advocates passionately for passing the Women Reservation Bill, which aims to reserve a minimum of 33% seats for women in Parliament, and in State Legislative Assemblies in India.

The National Alliance for Women’s Reservation Bill has been formed to attain the goal and to undertake the advocacy and campaign throughout India. More than 1,500 organizations and individuals from across India collected on a common stage to form the alliance. Centre for Social Research is one of the leading partners of the alliance.

Online Safety and Security 
Digital technology is a part of our lives, and it is our responsibility to make digital space safer and secure for us and future generations. The school and college-going students are actively using online platforms to access educational resources and enhance their knowledge, especially now due to the COVID-19 pandemic. The daily online engagement has also increased drastically since the pandemic hit early in the year 2020. Poor and marginalized sections of society are still far away from accessing digital devices and participate in the online exchange of information, including accessing educational resources, information, social media, etc.

CSR has been working on Online Safety & Security through various projects since almost a decade. We have worked on projects like - #SocialSurfing, #TweeSurfing, Digital Safety & Online Well-Being Workshops, Digital Citizenship & Civic  Participation for Gender Equality, CSW: Digital Safety & Citizenship Development and Advocacy for Civic Participation of Women & Children.

CSR also has an updated resource of Online Safety and Security Toolkit to educate and empower the internet users about the threats lurking online for children and adults alike, and the availability of various tools that can be used to not fall prey to online abusers, trolls or scammers and safeguard from cyberbullying and online harassment.

Gender Water and Climate Change 
The GWCC Department on climate change through the lens of gender. Since climate change is the defining issue of our time, and the impacts of climate change are most dramatically felt through changes in water – changes that will severely affect humans, society, and the environment. Women are central to the collection and safeguarding of water, and are responsible for more than 70 percent of water chores and management worldwide. In this context, it is important to note that women are more vulnerable to the effects of climate change than men – particularly as they constitute the majority of the world's poor, and are more dependent for their livelihood on natural resources that are negatively impacted by climate change. Further, they experience social, economic, and political barriers that limit their adaptation capacities.

CSR's aim is to strengthen climate action by promoting gender equality. Recognizing the important contributions of women as decision makers, educators, stakeholders, and experts across sectors and at all levels, can lead to successful, long-term solutions to climate change. We have worked with Self Help Groups (SHG's), Elected Women Representatives (EWR's), community members and leaders, technical experts, local practitioners, and government officials in Bihar, Nepal, and most notably across multiple districts in Rajasthan.

Sports for Empowering Girls 
The program of “Sports for Girls: Confidence-Building and Increasing the Value of Girl Children". The program is implemented in 5 districts in Haryana, and had been initiated in the year 2017-2018 by CSR with support from the Australian High Commission, New Delhi, India. The program areas were Ambala, Kurukshetra, Gurugram, Jhajjar and Mahendragarh districts of Haryana. We have been able to successfully address discrimination against girls and women in accessing sports facilities in the targeted districts.

The program is a step towards achieving gender equality by sensitizing communities towards merit of sports for girls. They promote social and leadership aspects of the participants by changing the socio-economic value of girl children. The key to CSR's approach is to make girls economically worthy for the family and the community at large, which will help in building acceptability for them as a long-term goal under ‘Beti Bachao Beti Padhao (BBBP)’ project.

See also
Gender discrimination in India
Dowry law in India

References 

 Indian women rise in business but not in power

Women's rights in India
Non-profit organisations based in India
Social movements in India